Himachal Pradesh provides water to both the Indus and Ganges basins. The drainage systems of the region are the Chenab, the Ravi, the Beas, the Satluj and the Yamuna. These rivers are perennial and are fed by snow and rainfall. They are protected by an extensive cover of natural vegetation.

The river is joined by a number of tributaries; the major tributaries are the Parbati, the Hurla, the Sainj, the Uhl, the Suheti, the Luni, the Banganga and the Chaki. The northern and eastern tributaries of the river are snow fed and perennial, while the southern ones are seasonal. During the month of August, increase in the inflow sometimes results in floods.

The Chenab River (Vedic name Askni), the largest river (in terms of volume of water) is formed after the meeting of two streams namely, Chandra and Bhaga at Tandi, in Lahaul. The Chandra passes through the barren tribal land.

The Ravi is born in Bara Banghal, Kangra district as a joint stream formed by the glacier fead Bhadal and Tantgari. Chamba lies on its right bank.

The Satluj originates in distant Tibet. The river cuts through both the great Himalayan and the Zaskar ranges and crosses the Indo-Tibetan border (near Shipkila). Then the river Spiti joins Satluj from the north, the Baspa joins it from the south. Passing through gorges it emerges from the mountains at Bhakra.

The Yamuna has its origin in Yamunotri in Uttarkashi district, Uttarakhand. Its tributaries are the Tons, the Giri and the Bata. Of these, Giri and Pabbar (a tributary of Tons) originate and flow in Himachal Pradesh.

References 

 
Himachal Pradesh